Ozgoleh District is a district (bakhsh) in Salas-e Babajani County, Kermanshah Province, Iran. At the 2006 census, its population was 7,125, in 1,388 families.  The District has one city: Ozgoleh. The District has three rural districts (dehestan): Jeygaran Rural District, Ozgoleh Rural District, and Sarqaleh Rural District.

References 

Salas-e Babajani County
Districts of Kermanshah Province